was a village located in Ibi District, Gifu Prefecture, Japan.

As of 2003, the village had an estimated population of 611 and a density of 3.99 persons per km2. The total area was 153.26 km2.

On January 31, 2005, Sakauchi, along with the villages of Fujihashi, Kasuga, Kuze and Tanigumi (all from Ibi District), was merged into the expanded town of Ibigawa and no longer exists as an independent municipality.

Notes

External links
 Official website of Ibigawa 

Dissolved municipalities of Gifu Prefecture
Ibi District, Gifu
Ibigawa, Gifu